The government of Nevada comprises three branches of government: the executive branch consisting of the governor of Nevada and the governor's cabinet along with the other elected constitutional officers; the legislative branch consisting of the Nevada Legislature which includes the Assembly and the Senate; and the judicial branch consisting of the Supreme Court of Nevada and lower courts.

Executive 
The governor and the governor's cabinet, along with five other elected statewide constitutional officers, constitute the executive branch.

Governor 

The governor of Nevada is the chief magistrate of Nevada, the head of the executive department of the state's government, and the commander-in-chief of the state's military forces. The governor has a duty to enforce state laws, and the power to either approve or veto bills passed by the Nevada Legislature, to convene the legislature at any time, and, except in cases of treason or impeachment, to grant pardons and reprieves.

The governor has a four-year term. To be elected governor, a person must be at least 25 years old, and must have been a citizen of Nevada for at least two years, at the time of election.

The current governor is Republican Joe Lombardo.

Constitutional officers 
Nevadans elect for four-year terms a lieutenant governor, secretary of state, state treasurer, state controller, and an attorney general at the same time and manner of choosing the governor. These independently elected executive-branch officers exercise powers and perform functions independent of both the governor and legislature.

The current Lieutenant Governor is Stavros Anthony (R). The Attorney General is Aaron D. Ford (D), the Secretary of State is Cisco Aguilar (D), the Treasurer is Zach Conine (D), and the Controller is Andy Matthews (R).

Cabinet 
The cabinet advises and assists the governor in the business of state government, civil and military. It is composed of the heads of those state agencies which come under the governor's appointing authority as chief executive, together with such other officials as the governor may from time to time invite. The cabinet currently consists of the following members:

 Lieutenant Governor
 Director of the Department of Administration
 Director of the Department of Agriculture
 Director of the Department of Business and Industry (B&I)
 Director of the Department of Conservation & Natural Resources
 Director of the Department of Corrections
 Director of the Department of Tourism and Cultural Affairs
 Executive Director of the Office of Economic Development
 Superintendent of Public Instruction of the Department of Education
 Director of the Department of Employment, Training & Rehabilitation (DETR)
 Director of the Nevada State Office of Energy
 Director of the Department of Health and Human Services (DHHS)
 Director of the Nevada Indian Commission
 Chief Information Officer of the Division of Enterprise Information Technology Services (EITS)
 Director of the Department of Motor Vehicles (DMV)
 Adjutant General of the Nevada Military Department and Nevada National Guard
 Director of the Department of Personnel (DOP)
 Director of the Department of Public Safety (DPS)
 Chancellor of the Nevada System of Higher Education
 Director of the Department of Transportation (NDOT)
 Executive Director of the Department of Veterans Services
 Director of the Nevada Department of Wildlife

State agencies 
Major state agencies include:

 Nevada Gaming Control Board
 Consumer Health Assistance
 Nevada Department of Cultural Affairs
 Governor's Office of Economic Development
 Nevada Film Office
 Department of Employment, Training & Rehabilitation
 Department of Health and Human Services
 Division of Minerals, Commission on Mineral Resources
 Department of Personnel
 Advisory Council for Prosecuting Attorneys
 Public Employees Benefit Program
 Public Employees Retirement System
 Public Utilities Commission
 Department of Taxation
 Commission on Tourism
 Universities and Community Colleges of Nevada
 Western Interstate Commission for Higher Education

Legislature 

The Nevada Legislature is a bicameral body divided into an Assembly and Senate. Members of the Assembly serve for 2 years, and members of the Senate serve for 4 years. Senators and Assemblymen/women are limited to a maximum of 12 years service in each house (by appointment or election which is a lifetime limit)—a provision of the constitution which was upheld by the Supreme Court of Nevada in a unanimous decision. Each session of the Legislature meets for a constitutionally mandated 120 days in every odd-numbered year, or longer if the governor calls a special session.

Currently, the Assembly is controlled by the Democratic Party (27 to 15 majority) and the Senate is also controlled by the Democratic Party (11 to 10 majority).

On December 18, 2018, Nevada was the first State with a female majority in its legislature. Nine of the 21 seats in the Nevada Senate are currently held by women, along with 23 of the 42 seats in the Assembly.

Judiciary 

The Supreme Court of Nevada is the state supreme court. Original jurisdiction is divided between the District Courts (with general jurisdiction), and Justice Courts and Municipal Courts (both of limited jurisdiction).

Local government 

Incorporated towns in Nevada, known as cities, are given the authority to legislate anything not prohibited by law. A recent movement has begun to permit home rule in incorporated Nevada cities to give them more flexibility and fewer restrictions from the legislature.

Unincorporated towns are settlements eminently governed by the county in which they are located, but who, by local referendum or by the act of the county commission, can form limited local governments in the form of a Town Advisory Board (TAB)/Citizens Advisory Council (CAC), or a Town Board.

Town Advisory Boards and Citizens Advisory Councils are formed purely by act of the county commission. Consisting of three to five members, these elected boards form a purely advisory role, and in no way diminish the responsibilities of the county commission that creates them. Members of advisory councils and boards are elected to two-year terms, and serve without compensation. The councils and boards, themselves, are provided no revenue, and oversee no budget.

Town Boards are limited local governments created by either the local county commission, or by referendum. The board consists of five members elected to four-year terms. Half the board is required to be up for election in each election. The board elects from within its ranks a town chairperson and town clerk. While more powerful than Town Advisory Boards and Citizens Advisory Councils, they also serve a largely advisory role, with their funding provided by their local county commission. The local county commission has the power to put before residents of the town a vote on whether to keep or dissolve a town board at any general election. Town boards have the ability to appoint a town manager if they choose to do so.

See also 
List of Nevada state agencies

References 

 
Nevada